The  was a Japanese Shinkansen high-speed train type operated by East Japan Railway Company (JR East) between 1992 and 2010 on Tsubasa services on Japan's first mini-shinkansen line, the Yamagata Shinkansen branch from the main Tohoku Shinkansen.

The fleet of 400 series trains was leased by JR East from the owning company, a third-sector company jointly owned by JR East and Yamagata Prefecture.

They were originally six-car sets, but a seventh car (type 429) was added in 1995 to each set due to the popularity of the new Tsubasa services.

Pre-series set
The pre-series set, S4, was delivered in October 1990, and shown off to the press on 26 October 1990. This was a six-car set arranged as shown below with all cars motored.

The unit featured three different types of bolster less bogies: DT9028 on cars 1 and 3, DT9029 on cars 2 and 4, and DT9030 on cars 5 and 6. The Green car seats featured seat-back TV screens, a feature not used on the subsequent production sets.

Test running continued into 1992, with set S4 reaching Tokyo for the first time on 20 May 1992. The pre-series set was then modified to bring it up to production batch standards, becoming set L1 on 29 June 1992.

Formation
The production 400 series sets were configured as shown below following the addition of a trailer car (car 15) in late 1995.

Cars 1 and 2 were built by Tokyu Car Corporation, cars 3 to 4 were built by Hitachi, and cars 5 to 6 were built by Kawasaki Heavy Industries. Cars 12 and 14 were equipped with pantographs.

Fleet details

Source:

Exterior

In terms of style, the 400 series were originally painted a medium silver grey with a darker roof and area around the cab windows and underframe. However they were refurbished and repainted between 1999 and 2001, with a higher area of dark bluish-grey on the underside, coming up almost to the side windows, and separated from the silver grey with a green stripe. The dark grey on the roof and around the cab windows was removed.

Clearances were much reduced compared to previous Shinkansen lines, and thus the 400 series units were much narrower than previous Shinkansen trains. At shinkansen stations (i.e. high-speed line stations), steps extended from beneath the doors to bridge the gap between the trains and platforms.

Interior
Green (first class) car accommodation had with 2+1 abreast seating, unlike the E3 series trains which replaced them, which featured 2+2 seating in both standard and Green cars.

When the fleet received life-extension refurbishment between 1999 and 2001, the interiors were also refurbished with new seat moquette. The reserved seating cars received red moquette, while the non-reserved seating cars received turquoise moquette.

History

Introduction
The fleet of 12 six-car sets entered service on the new Tsubasa shinkansen services from 1 July 1992. The six-car sets were all lengthened to seven cars between November and December 1995 with the addition of a new type 429 trailer car as car 15.

Withdrawal
Withdrawals started in December 2008, with the first set, L1. The entire fleet was scheduled to be withdrawn by summer 2009 and replaced by new E3-2000 series trains. However, one set, L3, remained in service until 18 April 2010, with the date chosen to mark 18 years of service.

Preservation
The first eleven sets to be withdrawn were all cut up at Sendai General Depot, but one car (Green car 411-3) of the last set to be withdrawn, L3, was stored at the former Fukushima depot before being moved to Omiya in Saitama Prefecture in December 2017 in preparation for preservation at the Railway Museum.

See also
List of high speed trains

References

External links

Shinkansen train series
East Japan Railway Company
Train-related introductions in 1992
Passenger trains running at least at 200 km/h in commercial operations
Hitachi multiple units
20 kV AC multiple units
25 kV AC multiple units
Kawasaki multiple units
Tokyu Car multiple units